Swantibor V (1454–1464) was a prince of Pomerania from the House of Griffins.

Life 
Swantibor was the eldest son of Duke Wartislaw X of Pomerania-Wolgast and his wife Elisabeth of Brandenburg.  He was born around 1454.  In the summer semester of 1462, when he was about eight years old, he was enrolled at the University of Greifswald.  This was shortly after a long-running dispute had been settled between the city of Greifswald and the Dukes Wartislaw X and his brother Eric II.  The University had been founded by Swantbor's grandfather, Wartislaw IX; Swantibor was the first member of the House of Griffins to be enrolled here.  In the winter semester of 1462–1463, Swantibor was elected rector of the University, to honor his grandfather.

In 1464, Swantibor died of the plague.  His younger brother Ertmar died at the same time.  Their father had no other children; their mother had a son, Duke Otto III from an earlier marriage to Duke Joachim the Younger.  However, Otto III was also killed by the plague in 1464.

Ancestors

Numeral 
The assignment of numerals to the Dukes in the House of Griffins had always been complicated.  Confusion is caused by different authors assigning different numerals to the dukes.  The modern approach is to assign numerals only to members of the House of Griffins who reached adulthood.  Under this approach, Swantibor would not be assigned a numeral.  Older sources, however, assigned numerals to all males members of the house.  Under that approach, this Swantibor would be Swantibor V.

See also 
 List of Pomeranian duchies and dukes

References 
 Martin Wehrmann: Genealogie des pommerschen Herzogshauses, Verlag Leon Sauniers Buchhandlung, Stettin, 1937, p. 105

Footnotes 

Dukes of Pomerania
People associated with the University of Greifswald
1454 births
Year of birth uncertain
1464 deaths
15th-century German people
15th-century deaths from plague (disease)

Royalty and nobility who died as children